is a passenger railway station located in the city of Chōfu, Tokyo, Japan, operated by the private railway operator Keio Corporation.

Lines 
Kokuryō Station is served by the Keio Line, and is located 14.2 kilometers from the starting point of the line at Shinjuku Station.

Station layout 
This station consists of one underground island platforms serving two tracks, with the station building located above. The underground tracks opened on August 19, 2012, replacing the ground-level tracks.

Platforms

History

The station opened on April 15, 1913, and relocated to its present location on December 17, 1927. The station was rebuilt as an underground station in 2012.

Passenger statistics
In fiscal 2019, the station was used by an average of 38,713 passengers daily. 

The passenger figures (boarding passengers only) for previous years are as shown below.

Surrounding area
 
 Chōfu Post Office

See also
 List of railway stations in Japan

References

External links

Keio Railway Station Information 

Keio Line
Stations of Keio Corporation
Railway stations in Tokyo
Chōfu, Tokyo
Railway stations in Japan opened in 1913